American singer LeAnn Rimes has released two video albums and appeared in 42 music videos. In 1996, she made her debut music video with the single "Blue". It was followed by the videos "One Way Ticket (Because I Can)", "The Light in Your Eyes", "How Do I Live" and "Amazing Grace". These videos were directed by chris rogers. It was not until 2000 that Rimes began working with different video directors. That year she collaborated with Joseph Kahn and Joey Rey on the video for her single "I Need You". David McNally then directed her next video for "Can't Fight the Moonlight". In 2005, Rimes formed a music video collaboration with David McClister for the songs "Probably Wouldn't Be This Way" and "Something's Gotta Give". The same year, Curb Records issued Rimes's debut video album titled The Best of LeAnn Rimes. The album was followed by her second release titled LeAnn Rimes: The Complete DVD Collection.

Rimes continued working with McClister on the music videos for "Some People", "Nothin' Better to Do" and her cover of "Swingin'". Starting in 2010, Rimes made five music videos with Nashville director Nigel Dick singles like "Give", "What Have I Done" and "Just a Girl Like You". Rimes then released two music videos in 2016. In addition to her music videos, Rimes has also appeared in several feature films and television films. In 1997, she acted in her first television film titled Holiday in Your Heart. It was followed by appearances in the movies Moesha (1999) and Coyote Ugly (2000). She has since appeared in the television films Holly Hobbie and Friends: Christmas Wishes (2006), Northern Lights (2009) and It's Christmas, Eve (2018).

Video albums

Music videos

As lead artist

Guest appearance
 "spaceship"

Filmography

References

Videographies of American artists
Works by LeAnn Rimes